Seward is the name of:

People

Surname
Seward (surname)

Middle name
William Seward Burroughs I (1857–1898), inventor of adding machine
William S. Burroughs (1914–1997), American novelist, poet, essayist and spoken word performer
John Seward Johnson II (born 1930), American sculptor
William S. Burroughs, Jr. (1947–1981), author and son of the above

First name
 Seward Collins (1899–1952), publisher of The American Review, prominent pre–World War II proponent of fascism
 Seward Smith, American politician, associate justice of the Dakota Territory Supreme Court

Places

United States

Counties
 Seward County, Kansas
 Seward County, Nebraska

Cities and towns
 Seward, Alaska
 Seward, Illinois
 Seward Township, Kendall County, Illinois
 Seward Township, Winnebago County, Illinois
 Seward, Kansas
 Seward Township, Minnesota
 Seward, Nebraska
 Seward, New York
 Seward, North Carolina
 Seward, Pennsylvania

Others
 Seward Highway, Alaska
 Seward Peninsula, Alaska
 Seward, Minneapolis, a neighborhood in Minneapolis, Minnesota
 Seward Lake, New York
 Seward Mountain (New York)
 Seward Park (disambiguation)
 Seward High School (disambiguation)
 Seward Plantation, a Southern plantation in Independence, Texas

World
 Seward Mountains (disambiguation), various places
 Sewards End, a village and civil parish in the Uttlesford district of Essex, England

Other uses
 Seward Trunk Co., an American luggage company

See also
Siward (disambiguation)